Reality Check is the second studio album by American rapper Seagram, released on May 31, 1994 via Rap-A-Lot Records and Priority Records. The album was produced entirely by Jeff Gray, Seagram and Troy White. It would be Seagram's last album during his lifetime. It peaked at number 53 on the Billboard Top R&B/Hip-Hop Albums and at number 31 on the Billboard Top Heatseekers.

Track listing
 "The Town" (featuring Gangsta P, Angie & Y-D) - 4:55
 "Gangsta Livin" - 4:19
 "It Don't Stop" (featuring Gangsta P) - 3:42
 "Can't Win for Losin" - 4:38
 "Bustas, Tricks & Thangs" - 2:07
 "Birth" - 5:26
 "Where Do We Go From Here" - 4:31
 "Eastside" - 3:28
 "13 Deep" (featuring Gangsta P) - 4:40
 "No Matter the Cost" - 6:02
 "Gangstas & Players" (featuring Too Short) - 5:05
 "The Old School" - 4:37
 "69" - 3:12
 "Peace to You" (featuring Down by Law) - 3:41

Samples
Birth
"For the Love of You" by The Isley Brothers
The Old School
"Love T.K.O." by Teddy Pendergrass
The Town
"Haboglabotribin'" by Bernard Wright

Chart history

References

External links 
 Reality Check at Discogs

Seagram (rapper) albums
1994 albums
Priority Records albums
Rap-A-Lot Records albums